Oleksii Dmytrovych Zenchenko (born 17 October 1996) is a Ukrainian footballer who plays as a defender for FC Chernihiv.

Career
Zenchenko is a product of Yunist Chernihiv in Chernihiv. In 2016 he played 17 matches with Yednist' Plysky and 2 matches with Avangard Korukivka.

FC Chernihiv 
In 2017, Zenchenko signed for FC Chernihiv of the Ukrainian Second League.
He made his debut against Rubikon Kyiv. On 20 March 2021 he scored his first goal for the club against Karpaty Halych. On 12 November 2022 he made his debut in the Ukrainian First League against LNZ Cherkasy at the Cherkasy Arena, replacing Artur Bybik in the 88th minute.

Career statistics

Club

Honours
FC Chernihiv
 Chernihiv Oblast Football Championship: 2019

References

External links
 Oleksiy Zenchenko at FC Chernihiv 
 
 

1995 births
Living people
Footballers from Chernihiv
FC Chernihiv players
FC Yunist Chernihiv players
FC Avanhard Koriukivka players
FC Yednist Plysky players
Ukrainian footballers
Ukrainian Second League players
Ukrainian First League players
Association football defenders